The following highways are numbered 616:

Canada
Alberta Highway 616
New Brunswick Route 616
Saskatchewan Highway 616

Costa Rica
 National Route 616

United States